

Most Successful Teams

UAE Pro League = PL
UAE President's Cup = PC
UAE League Cup = LC
UAE Federation Cup (defunct) = FC
UAE Super Cup = SC
AFC Champions League = ACL
GCC Champions League = GCL
Emirati-Moroccan Super Cup = EMSC

Successful Teams
Most successful clubs in the UAE by their combined trophy count
Last updated on 21 October 2022, following Sharjah winning the President's Cup, .

Notes
1. Al Ain include 2 Abu Dhabi Championship (not official by UAEFA), 1 Joint League Cup.
2. Sharjah include 1 Joint League Cup.
3. Al Nasr include 1 ADNOC Championship (not official by UAEFA), 1 Joint League Cup.
4. Al Shabab and Dubai CSC merged into Al-Ahli form Shabab Al Ahli in 2017
5. Al Shaab dissolved in 2017, after club merged with Sharjah

Continental Titles

AFC Champions League

Gulf Club Champions Cup

Emirati-Moroccan Super Cup

Domestic Titles

Pro-League

President's Cup

Federation Cup

Super Cup

League Cup

Minor Titles

Abu Dhabi Championship Cup

Joint League Cup
Source:

Asian Champions League

Participations

QS : Qualifying Stage, G : Group Round, R16 : Round of 16,  QF : Quarterfinals, SF : Semifinal, R : Runner-up, C : Champions, DQ : Disqualified, WD : Withdrew

Asian Club Championship

Participations

A total of six clubs represented UAE in the AFC Asian Club Championship which became defunct in 2002 
(see : AFC Champions League).

QS : Qualifying Stage, G : Group Round, 4th : Fourth Place, 3rd : Third Place, WD : Withdrew

Arab Club Champions Cup

Participations

GS : Group Stage, R32 : Round of 32, R16 : Round of 16, QF : Quarter final, SF : Semi final, R : Runner-up, C : Champions, WD : Withdrew

FIFA Club World Cup

Participations

Q = Qualified, 7th = seventh place, 6th = sixth place, 5th = fifth place, 
4th = fourth place, 3rd = third place, 2nd = runner up, 1st = champions

References

External links
 Official website 

Football in the United Arab Emirates